Danaher is a surname. Notable people with the surname include:

 Declan Danaher, English Rugby union player
 John Danaher (VC), Irish recipient of the Victoria Cross
 John Danaher (martial artist), New Zealand Brazilian jiu-jitsu and mixed martial arts instructor
 Kevin Danaher (Caoimhín Ó Danachair), (1913–2002), author and prominent Irish folklorist
 Kevin Danaher (activist), Ph.D. in sociology, author of several books on Green Economy

See also
 Danaher Corporation, a company headquartered in Washington, D.C.